Olga Moreno Peral, also known as Chola, is a Spanish football defender, currently playing for CE Sant Gabriel in the Spanish First Division. She previously played for FC Barcelona, Levante UD, CE Sabadell and RCD Espanyol, winning the championship with the latter in 2006. With Levante she played the UEFA Women's Cup.

She was a member of the Spain women's national football team.

Titles
 1 Spanish League (2006)
 3 Spanish Cup (2006, 2009, 2010)

References

1979 births
Living people
Spanish women's footballers
Spain women's international footballers
FC Barcelona Femení players
Primera División (women) players
RCD Espanyol Femenino players
CE Sabadell Femení players
Levante UD Femenino players
Women's association football defenders
Footballers from Barcelona
Sportswomen from Catalonia
CE Sant Gabriel players
21st-century Spanish women